Victor Hazael Garza Garza (born February 25, 1992) is an American soccer player.

Club career

Professional
On February 3, 2012, Garza debuted with Liga MX México Primera División side Tigres on Copa Libertadores match against Union Espanola.

In 2013, Garza played one friendly match with Turkish club Konyaspor versus rival Antalyaspor.

In 2014, Garza captained US NPSL team Dallas City FC and won the Trinity River Cup. Garza played 1,260 minutes and contributed eight goals and 13 assists.

On January 17, 2015, Garza signed with Armenian first division side Ararat Yerevan.

In 2016, after trying out his luck in Europe, he returned to Tigres, who loaned him out to Ascenso MX team Tampico Madero F.C.

In 2017, Victor returns to his native Rio Grande Valley to play for United Soccer League team Rio Grande Valley FC Toros on loan from Tigres.

In 2018, Garza suffered a major knee injury and lost most of his season with the Toros. He recovered from the injury and was given shirt number 10 for the 2019 USL season. His move to the Rio Grande Valley FC Toros became permanent after the team purchased his rights from Tigres.

International career
Garza has represented the United States at the U17 level, playing two international friendly matches, and at the U20 level, playing four international friendly matches.

References

People from McAllen, Texas
1992 births
Living people
American soccer players
American expatriate soccer players
Tigres UANL footballers
FC Ararat Yerevan players
Tampico Madero F.C. footballers
Rio Grande Valley FC Toros players
USL Championship players
Liga MX players
Armenian Premier League players
Expatriate footballers in Armenia
Expatriate footballers in Mexico
Soccer players from Texas
Association football midfielders
Association football forwards